Panupong Chimpook or the nickname  "Tum"  is a Thai retired football defender who played for Thailand in the 2000 Asian Cup.

External links

11v11 Profile

References

Panupong Chimpook
Living people
Year of birth missing (living people)
Place of birth missing (living people)
Association football defenders
Panupong Chimpook
Footballers at the 1998 Asian Games
Panupong Chimpook